"Higher" is a song by Canadian singer Deborah Cox. Released as a single on March 18, 2013, the track became her twelfth number one hit on Billboard's US Dance Club Songs chart.

Track listings

Charts

Weekly charts

Year-end charts

See also
List of number-one dance singles of 2014 (U.S.)

References

2013 songs
2013 singles
Deborah Cox songs
Canadian dance-pop songs
House music songs
Songs written by Deborah Cox
Electronic dance music songs